Ouratea cocleensis is a species of plant in the family Ochnaceae. It is found in Costa Rica and Panama. It is threatened by habitat loss.

References

cocleensis
Endemic flora of Costa Rica
Endemic flora of Panama
Taxonomy articles created by Polbot